Group H of the 2002 FIFA World Cup took place on 14 June 2002. Japan won the group and advanced to the second round, along with Belgium. Russia and Tunisia failed to advance.

Standings

Japan advanced to play Turkey (runner-up of Group C) in the round of 16.
Belgium advanced to play Brazil (winner of Group C) in the round of 16.

Matches
All times are local (UTC+9)

Japan vs Belgium

Russia vs Tunisia

Japan vs Russia

Tunisia vs Belgium

Tunisia vs Japan

Belgium vs Russia

External links
 Results

H
Russia at the 2002 FIFA World Cup
Belgium at the 2002 FIFA World Cup
Japan at the 2002 FIFA World Cup
Tunisia at the 2002 FIFA World Cup